Chengbei Subdistrict is a subdistrict of Lianjiang in southwestern Guangdong, People's Republic of China, occupying the northern portion of the urban area of Lianjiang as suggested by its name. , it has 2 residential communities and 3 villages under its administration.

See also 
 List of township-level divisions of Guangdong

References 

Subdistricts of the People's Republic of China
Township-level divisions of Guangdong
Zhanjiang